Kill or Capture: How a Special Operations Task Force Took Down a Notorious al Qaeda Terrorist is a book published by Macmillan Publishing in early 2011. The author, a former interrogator, criticizes the use of "extended interrogation techniques".
The author, who wrote under the pseudonym Matthew Alexander, was interviewed on  National Public Radio on February 14, 2011.
He said 
Alexander is also the author of How to Break a Terrorist: The U.S. Interrogators Who Used Brains, Not Brutality, to Take Down the Deadliest Man in Iraq. 
According to Jeff Stein, writing in The Washington Post, the author's real name was Anthony Camerino, a major in the United States Air Force Reserve.
Steven E. Levingston, also writing in the Washington Post, asserted that the book describes how bad intelligence routinely lead to targeting the wrong individuals.

References

2011 non-fiction books
Books about al-Qaeda
Macmillan Publishers books